Tanveer Wasim "Tan" France ( Safdar; born 20 April 1983) is a British-American fashion designer and television personality. Of Pakistani descent, he is one of the first openly gay South Asian men on a major show and one of the first out Muslim gay men on western television as the fashion expert for the Netflix series Queer Eye, host of the web series Dressing Funny and co-host of Next In Fashion. His memoir, Naturally Tan, was released in June 2019.

Early life
Tanveer "Tan" Wasim Safdar was born and raised in South Yorkshire, England, to Muslim Pakistani parents. In his memoir, France has discussed how he felt alienated due to his experience of growing up in a household where homosexuality was viewed negatively, the lack of representation in media of his community (and of LGBTQ Pakistani people in particular) and his personal experiences of physical and verbal racism in his childhood and adult life. France said: "Our home wasn't super religious but we had a profound connection to our Muslim heritage."

France's interest in fashion began at a young age, inspired by the Disney clothing that was made in his grandparents' denim factory in Bury, England, where he spent time working. By the age of thirteen, he had learned how to construct and embellish a denim jacket. In 2019, he allegedly learned that his grandfather had to close the factory due to the products being Disney knockoffs.

France attended Hall Cross School and later Doncaster College, where he studied fashion, after which he moved to Manchester, and then to London.

Career
France began work as designer and director for Zara, Selfridges, and Bershka, among other retailers, to further improve his knowledge of the wholesale business of retail; he later went on to work at a number of brands in order to learn more about manufacturing. He started in menswear and later progressed in womenswear, which he majored in for his fashion degree. France commented that he would often work as a stylist if a high-profile client came into the stores where he was working.

France began working in the United States in 2008, initially living in New York City, and immigrated to the US in 2015. France was company director at Shade Clothing before he opened his solo fashion company in 2011, called Kingdom & State. The brand included clothing designed to meet Mormon clothing guidelines, a group that represented a significant population in Utah, where France was living. He later created two smaller apparel brands. France's designs were purchased by retailers ModCloth and Forever 21. The designs were displayed on the website and stores under the brand name for many years. In 2016 he later became co-founder, fashion designer, and CEO for the Rachel Parcell Inc clothing line, which was sold at Nordstrom.

After selling his businesses, France officially retired, having the intention to start a family with his husband, but he was later contacted by Netflix. This started his journey as a media figure through his role as the fashion expert on Queer Eye, which premiered in February 2018. In 2019, France appeared in the music video for Taylor Swift's song "You Need to Calm Down". He also appeared in 2020 in a special charity edition of The Great British Bake Off, in order to raise funds for Stand Up To Cancer, and he was the winner of the episode That year, it was also announced that France would be co-hosting the new Netflix series Next In Fashion with Alexa Chung. In interviews with the ITV programme This Morning and with NPR, France disclosed that he had sold all three of his businesses after starting work for Netflix.

In 2019 France designed an eyewear line by partnering with Eyebuydirect. Since 2019, he is a GQ Middle East official columnist. From 2020, he is Express’s monthly stylist.

France was nominated for an Emmy alongside his Queer Eye co-stars for best hosting as reality or competition program in July 2020. In September 2020, France was announced as a style instructor on MasterClass, an educational streaming video platform. In September 2020 The Tan France x Etsy limited edition collection was launched. France co-designed a collection of home decor and foods with thirteen independent sellers.

Personal life
France currently lives in Salt Lake City, Utah, with his husband, Rob France, who is a pediatric nurse and illustrator.
France married his husband twice, first in London and then in New York City, after marriage there became legal. On 13 April 2021, he announced on Instagram that he and Rob were expecting their first child, via surrogacy. Their son was born seven weeks early on 10 July 2021 and had to spend three weeks in the NICU.

France has a deep love for cooking and especially baking, having learned how to cook and sew from the age of nine.

France was naturalized as a US citizen on 9 June 2020 after "working towards" it for ten years. He kept his British citizenship, making him a dual citizen of both countries.

In September 2019, France, who is vocal about the colorism, racism, and Islamophobia he has endured throughout his life, created an Instagram account called "Shaded", in which he promotes black people, people of colour, and cultural diversity. In September 2020, France revealed on an episode of The Carlos Watson Show that one of the primary reasons for his leaving the United Kingdom for the United States was racism.

Books
Tan France released a memoir, Naturally Tan, in June 2019 through St. Martin's Press. It became a NYT best seller. It is about his experience growing up "gay in a traditional Muslim family, as one of the few people of colour in Doncaster, England". The memoir starts with his childhood in England where episodes of racism were everyday occurrences – like having to run back to school to avoid getting beaten up by racist thugs. The book follows up with heavy topics, such as colourism across South Asia and the Islamophobia he faced before and after the 9/11 attacks.

Filmography

Television

Music videos

Notes

References

External links 

1983 births
Living people
American fashion designers
American people of Pakistani descent
American television personalities
British emigrants to the United States
British television personalities
English fashion designers
English Muslims
English people of Pakistani descent
Gay entertainers
English LGBT entertainers
American LGBT entertainers
LGBT fashion designers
LGBT Muslims
Naturalized citizens of the United States
People from Doncaster
Television personalities from South Yorkshire